The 2006 Belgian Supercup was a football match between the winners of the previous season's Belgian First Division and Belgian Cup competitions. It was played and abandoned at halftime on 22 July 2006, due to excessive rain and later replayed from the beginning on 20 December 2006. The match was contested by Cup winners Zulte Waregem, and 2005–06 Belgian First Division champions, Anderlecht. Both matches were played at the ground of the league champions as usual, in this case the Constant Vanden Stock Stadium.

Anderlecht won its seventh Supercup title, as it beat Zulte Waregem in the (replayed) match by a score of 3–1 through goals from Ahmed Hassan, Juhász and Siani.

Details

Abandoned Match Details
Originally, the match was to be played on 22 July 2006, but stopped at halftime due to excessive rain and thunderstorms . At that point, no goals had been made.

See also
2005–06 Belgian First Division
2005–06 Belgian Cup

References

Belgian Super Cup, 2006
S.V. Zulte Waregem matches
Belgian Super Cup, 2006
Belgian Supercup
December 2006 sports events in Europe